Eigevannskollen is a neighbourhood in the city of Kristiansand in Agder county, Norway. It is located in the borough of Grim and in the district of Tinnheia. It is located south of the lake Eigevann in Tinnheia and next to Hellemyr. Eigevann is north of the European route E39 highway and the neighbourhood is west of Hannevikåsen.

References

Geography of Kristiansand
Neighbourhoods of Kristiansand